José Manuel Sagasta (born 1912, date of death unknown) was an Argentine equestrian. He competed in two events at the 1948 Summer Olympics.

References

1912 births
Year of death missing
Argentine male equestrians
Olympic equestrians of Argentina
Equestrians at the 1948 Summer Olympics
Place of birth missing